The women's single sculls competition at the 2012 Summer Paralympics in London took place are at Eton Dorney Lake which, for the purposes of the Games venue, is officially termed Eton Dorney.

Results

Heats
The winner of each heat qualify to the finals, remainder goes to the repeachge.

Heat 1

Heat 2

Repechages
First two of each repechage qualify to the finals.

Repechage 1

Repechage 2

Finals

Final A

Final B

Women's single sculls
2012 in women's rowing
Women's rowing in the United Kingdom